Limpia Concepción Fretes Cáceres (born 24 June 2000) is a Paraguayan professional footballer who plays as a left back for Brazilian Série A1 club Avaí FC and the Paraguay women's national team.

References

External links

2000 births
Living people
Women's association football fullbacks
Paraguayan women's footballers
Paraguay women's international footballers
Pan American Games competitors for Paraguay
Footballers at the 2019 Pan American Games
Cerro Porteño players
21st-century Paraguayan women